Words as Weapons may refer to:

 "Words as Weapons" (Seether song), a 2014 song by South African rock band Seether
 "Words as Weapons" (Birdy song), a 2014 song by English musician Birdy